Air Vice-Marshal Maria Byford,  is a senior Royal Air Force officer. Byford has been serving as Chief of Staff Personnel and Air Secretary since February 2020.

RAF career
Byford studied dentistry at King's College London, graduating with a Bachelor of Dental Surgery (BDS) degree in 1991. That year, she joined the Royal Air Force (RAF). After a career in dentistry, she became Head of the Personnel Division at HQ Surgeon-General in 2011. Following deployment as commander of Medical Joint Force Support in Afghanistan in 2014, she became Head of Future Healthcare at HQ Surgeon-General in 2015 and Head of RAF Medical Services in 2019. She was appointed Honorary Dental Surgeon to the Queen (QHDS) in 2015.

In February 2020 Byford was appointed Air Secretary with effect from 24 February 2020.

References

 

 
 
 

Living people
Royal Air Force air marshals
Women in the Royal Air Force
Female air marshals of the Royal Air Force
Year of birth missing (living people)
British dentists
Alumni of King's College London
Place of birth missing (living people)
Royal Air Force Medical Service officers